Blues Funeral is the seventh studio album by American alternative rock musician Mark Lanegan, released on February 6, 2012 on 4AD. The album was recorded with producer Alain Johannes throughout early 2011 and Johannes, as well as other musicians including Greg Dulli,  David Catching and Jack Irons, contributed to the recording process. Blues Funeral was announced for release on November 7, 2011 through Lanegan's official website and less than a month later, the album's lead single, "The Gravedigger's Song," was released as a digital download on iTunes.

Aside from collaborative albums with Isobel Campbell, and other collaboration projects including Soulsavers and The Gutter Twins, Blues Funeral is Mark Lanegan's  first new material in eight years, since Bubblegum (2004) Upon its release, Blues Funeral received widespread critical acclaim and charted in six countries within the week of its release, including Belgium, the Netherlands, Sweden, New Zealand and the United Kingdom.

Background
Following extensive collaborations with Isobel Campbell, former vocalist and celloist of indie pop band Belle & Sebastian, Lanegan began working on Blues Funeral after the tour in promotion of their third collaborative studio album, Hawk (2010). The tour concluded on October 29, 2010 in Los Angeles, California and Lanegan subsequently began composing songs. In an interview with Mojo, Lanegan described his writing process for the album, saying that: "[all of the songs on the new record] were written right before or during the period when we recorded" and "generally I write on the guitar, but this one I started a few with the keyboard and a drum machine, to do something different. With Al [Johannes], I can show him something on acoustic guitar and give him a description and within a couple of hours it's done."

In his 2017 book I Am the Wolf: Lyrics & Writings, Lanegan admits he had more or less lost interest in writing and singing after a near death experience, and it was only after recording "Burning Jacob's Ladder" with producer Alain Johannes as the initial trailer tune for the video game Rage that the pair continued collaborating, with the singer commenting, "If forced to choose only one of my albums to play live, this would be it."

Composition
The Quietus described the album's sound as: "Blues Funeral incorporates beats marshalled by sequencers with grand cinematic sweeps and a rock & roll sensibility that reveals an artist refusing to paint himself into a corner." Lanegan also noted that "with this new record, because I use a lot of the elements of my influences that I haven't on previous record, I've made a record that's something more like I would personally listen to than some of the records that I've made before," and listed the album's influences as The Gun Club's Miami, Joy Division's Closer and Roxy Music's Country Life amongst others.  Lanegan reflects on the album and its compositions in I Am the Wolf:

 "'The Gravedigger's Song' was something I had originally tried to use on someone else's recording, but it didn't make any sense until a drumbeat lifted from an Adam Ant song proved to be its missing component..."
 "'Riot in My House' was inspired, like many of my tunes through the years, by the music of Swedish band The Leather Nun."
 "Danish director Nicolas Winding Refn's Pusher trilogy was the stimulus behind 'Ode to Sad Disco,' and its music was taken in part from the Pusher II soundtrack."
"Blues Funeral'''s title is an homage to the great T.S. McPhee's band The Groundhogs, and its overall sound is reflective of my Krautrock listening habit..."

Release
Lanegan's official website posted a press release on November 7, 2011 announcing that Blues Funeral was due to be released worldwide on February 6, 2012. The album was made available for pre-order on iTunes and domestic versions of the album on CD and double LP were made available through the 4AD Store and Amazon. Physical versions of the album were released a day later than the digital release. On January 21, 2012, Amazon previewed thirty-second clips of each songs on the album and on January 31, Mojo made the album available for stream in its entirety.

Tour

A two-leg tour was planned to accompany the release of Blues Funeral throughout spring 2012. Lanegan performed two shows in the United States—at the Bowery Ballroom in New York on February 7 and at Echoplex in Los Angeles, California on February 9— prior to the European tour which will last from February 24 to April 2. The tour will include Norway, Finland, the Netherlands, Belgium, United Kingdom, Ireland, Germany, Denmark, Poland, Czech Republic, Slovakia, Austria, Croatia, Italy, Switzerland, Spain, and Portugal. Following the release of the album, Lanegan announced two further legs of the tour with five shows in Australia and New Zealand in April and with twelve shows in the United States, Mexico and Canada in May.

ReceptionBlues Funeral was released to positive critical acclaim. At Metacritic, which assigns a normalised rating out of 100 to reviews from mainstream critics, the album received an average score of 75, based on 32 reviews, indicating "generally favorable reviews." Mojo reviewer Keith Cameron said that "no other singer of his generation plumbs the depths so credibly, or does mournful with such grace," awarded the album a full five stars and referred to it as an "instant MOJO classic." Andy Gill of The Independent called Blues Funeral "the most accomplished of Lanegan's albums," adding that the album is "boasting a rare congruence between lyrical themes and musical evocations". BBC Music's Kevin Harley said that the album "deepens his pitch while exhibiting a range and grace beyond his death's-head profile" and "sells [the songs] with conviction and character." Tom Hughes of The Guardian described it as "bluesy, lugubrious, modernish rock, elevated by Lanegan's remarkable gravel-pit of a voice" but concluded that "running close to a full hour, this can feel like a long funeral." Drowned in Sound reviewer Robert Leedham referred to the album as "deliciously callous but cursedly familiar" and added that it was "a record for ardent fans and not casual admirers." Jason Heller of The A.V. Club referred to the album as "a blatant and lackluster attempt to keep up with the times" and criticised its production "in which no note or texture is left digitally unprocessed." Pitchfork described Blues Funeral as "a mixed bag" and the songs as "many dirges that simply drag," but positively noted the album's influences and Lanegan's vocals ("almost invariably powerful on a sheer physical level"). Stereogum'' listed the album as Album Of The Week upon its release and gave a very positive review applauding Lanegan's vocals, the album's synthpop influences and "his most unburdened album in many, many years."

Track listing

Japanese bonus track

Personnel

Musicians
Mark Lanegan - vocals
Alain Johannes - guitar, bass, keyboards, percussion, backing vocals
Jack Irons - drums
Aldo Struyf - keyboards (8, 9, 12), guitar (12)
Dave Rosser - guitar (3, 6)
Duke Garwood - guitar (2, 12)
David Catching - guitar (2,5 & 11)
Martyn LeNoble - bass (7, 9)

Guest musicians
Chris Goss - guitar (10), backing vocals (10)
Greg Dulli - backing vocals (4)
Josh Homme - guitar (5)
Shelley Brien - backing vocals (8)

Technical personnel
Alain Johannes - producer, engineer, mixing

Chart positions

Year-end charts

References

2012 albums
Mark Lanegan albums
4AD albums
Albums produced by Alain Johannes